Guryong or Guryong Village is an illegal encampment (commonly called a shantytown, or "moon village" in Korean) on private land in Seoul, South Korea, on the edge of the affluent southside district of Dogok-dong, Gangnam District from which it is separated by a six-lane motorway.

History
The area which the village sits on has been inhabited since October 1925, though its beginnings as a shantytown started in 1988 when squatters evicted from houses in other low-income areas demolished during the city's rapid development prior to the 1988 Olympic Games, and who came to this area as their last refuge. Since at least 2011, there have been plans for re-purposing the area and relocating the residents, though little progress has been made due to disagreements between officials on the best plan of action. 2015 government plans propose to demolish Guryong and arrange subsidized housing for residents. It has an estimated 2,500 to 4,000 inhabitants (all numbers are estimates as no demographic survey of that area has ever been conducted), primarily impoverished elderly, living in between 1,200 and 2,000 shacks and trailers in a village area of about 286,929 square meters (about 70 acres). The residents, who have established a postal service in their area, have received temporary residence cards in 2011. The village has buildings like kindergarten and church, utilities like water, gas and electricity, for which payments are communal; and its own security, all organized through two village associations.

Due to unsafe construction, the village has been affected by a number of fire accidents, most recently in January 2023, when a fire destroyed more than 60 homes in the town, forcing the displacement of 62 residents.

It has been called "the last slum in Seoul's glitzy Gangnam district" and "the last shanty town in Gangnam" and, broader, "the last remaining urban slum in Seoul" although this claim is questioned due to the continued existence of at least two other notable areas.

The Gangnam government is planning to redevelop the area with new apartment for 7,671 people by 2025. As of 2019, 406 out of 1,107 households (36.7%) had been relocated. Many of the remaining residents are seniors, some earning less than $10 a day.

See also
Poverty in South Korea

References

Neighbourhoods in Gangnam District
Shanty towns in Asia
1988 establishments in South Korea
Squats